Space Shower Music is a Japanese record label and talent agency owned by Space Shower Network, best known as the operator of Space Shower TV.

History

In 2004, Space Shower Network became a third party investor in 3D Systems, with the company being renamed  in 2006, and officially becoming a partner business of Space Shower. In 2011, BounDEE became a fully owned enterprise of the Space Shower Network, with the label being renamed Space Shower Music in 2014.

Imprints 
BounDEE
Cabron Music
C.H.S
Eninal
Felicity
HARDCORE TANO*C
Newhere Music
Silver Sun Records
SKETCH UP! Rec.
Smile19

Artists
Aaamyyy
The Aprils
Curly Giraffe
Tommy Guerrero
Hifana
ROTH BART BARON
Ryoichi Higuchi
Terumasa Hino
Hitsuji Bungaku
Humbert Humbert
Hideki Kaji
Nothing's Carved in Stone
Masayoshi Ōishi
Yasuyuki Okamura
Pink Babies
Scha Dara Parr
Suchmos
Takao Tajima
Tempalay

References

External links
 SPACE SHOWER MUSIC official website 

Japanese companies established in 1999
Japanese independent record labels
Japanese record labels
Japanese talent agencies
Mass media companies based in Tokyo
Record label distributors
Record labels established in 1999
Talent agencies based in Tokyo